The Neillsville Standpipe is located in Neillsville, Wisconsin.

History
The standpipe is located at the highest point in Neillsville and consists of a steel water tank made by the Pittsburgh-Des Moines Steel Co. encased in a  slip-form concrete tower built by Tierweiler Bros. of Marshfield. It was added to the State Register of Historic Places in 2012 and to the National Register of Historic Places the following year.

References

Water towers on the National Register of Historic Places in Wisconsin
National Register of Historic Places in Clark County, Wisconsin
Infrastructure completed in 1926